Fluvoxamine, sold under the brand name Luvox among others, is an antidepressant of the selective serotonin reuptake inhibitor (SSRI) class. It is primarily used to treat major depressive disorder and obsessive–compulsive disorder (OCD), but is also used to treat anxiety disorders such as panic disorder, social anxiety disorder, and post-traumatic stress disorder.

Fluvoxamine's side-effect profile is very similar to other SSRIs: constipation, gastrointestinal problems, headache, anxiety, irritation, sexual problems, dry mouth, sleep problems and a risk of suicide at the start of treatment by lifting the psychomotor inhibition, but these effects appear to be significantly weaker than with other SSRIs (except gastrointestinal side-effects). The tolerance profile is superior in some respects to other SSRIs, particularly with respect to cardiovascular complications, despite its age.

It is on the World Health Organization's List of Essential Medicines.

Medical uses
In many countries (e.g., Australia, the UK, and Russia) it is commonly used for major depressive disorder. Fluvoxamine is also approved in the United States for obsessive–compulsive disorder (OCD), and social anxiety disorder. In Japan it is also approved to treat OCD, social anxiety disorder and major depressive disorder. Fluvoxamine is indicated for children and adolescents with OCD. The drug works long-term, and retains its therapeutic efficacy for at least one year. It has also been found to possess some analgesic properties in line with other SSRIs and tricyclic antidepressants. There is tentative evidence that fluvoxamine may help some people with negative symptoms of chronic schizophrenia.

Anxiety disorders 
Fluvoxamine is effective for social phobia in adults. 

Fluvoxamine is also effective for treating a range of anxiety disorders in children and adolescents, including generalized anxiety disorder, social anxiety disorder, panic disorder and separation anxiety disorder.

Adverse effects
Gastrointestinal side effects are more common in those receiving fluvoxamine. Fluvoxamine's side-effect profile is very similar to other SSRIs.

Common (1–10% incidence) adverse effects

 Abdominal pain
 Agitation
 Anxiety
 Asthenia (weakness)
 Constipation
 Diarrhea
 Dizziness
 Dyspepsia (indigestion)
 Headache
 Hyperhidrosis (excess sweating)
 Insomnia
 Loss of appetite
 Malaise
 Nausea
 Nervousness
 Palpitations
 Restlessness
 Sexual dysfunction (including delayed ejaculation, erectile dysfunction, decreased libido, etc.)
 Somnolence (drowsiness)
 Tachycardia (high heart rate)
 Tremor
 Vomiting
 Weight loss
 Xerostomia (dry mouth)
 Yawning

Uncommon (0.1–1% incidence) adverse effects

 Arthralgia
 Confusional state
 Cutaneous hypersensitivity reactions (e.g. oedema [buildup of fluid in the tissues], rash, pruritus)
 Extrapyramidal side effects (e.g. dystonia, parkinsonism, tremor, etc.)
 Hallucination
 Orthostatic hypotension

Rare (0.01–0.1% incidence) adverse effects

 Abnormal hepatic (liver) function
 Galactorrhoea (expulsion of breast milk unrelated to pregnancy or breastfeeding)
 Mania
 Photosensitivity (being abnormally sensitive to light)
 Seizures

Unknown frequency adverse effects

 Akathisia – a sense of inner restlessness that presents itself with the inability to stay still
 Bed-wetting
 Bone fractures
 Dysgeusia
 Ecchymoses
 Glaucoma
 Haemorrhage
 Hyperprolactinaemia (elevated plasma prolactin levels leading to galactorrhoea, amenorrhoea [cessation of menstrual cycles], etc.)
 Hyponatraemia
 Mydriasis
 Neuroleptic malignant syndrome – practically identical presentation to serotonin syndrome except with a more prolonged onset
 Paraesthesia
 Serotonin syndrome – a potentially fatal condition characterised by abrupt onset muscle rigidity, hyperthermia (elevated body temperature), rhabdomyolysis, mental status changes (e.g. coma, hallucinations, agitation), etc.
 Suicidal ideation and behaviour
 Syndrome of inappropriate antidiuretic hormone secretion
 Urinary incontinence
 Urinary retention
 Violence towards others
 Weight changes
 Withdrawal symptoms

Interactions

Fluvoxamine inhibits the following cytochrome P450 enzymes:

 CYP1A2 (strongly) which metabolizes agomelatine, amitriptyline, caffeine, clomipramine, clozapine, duloxetine, haloperidol, imipramine, phenacetin, tacrine, tamoxifen, theophylline, olanzapine, etc.
 CYP3A4 (moderately) which metabolizes alprazolam, aripiprazole, clozapine, haloperidol, quetiapine, pimozide, ziprasidone, etc.
 CYP2D6 (weakly) which metabolizes aripiprazole, chlorpromazine, clozapine, codeine, fluoxetine, haloperidol, olanzapine, oxycodone, paroxetine, perphenazine, pethidine, risperidone, sertraline, thioridazine, zuclopenthixol, etc.
 CYP2C9 (moderately) which metabolizes nonsteroidal anti-inflammatory drugs, phenytoin, sulfonylureas, etc.
 CYP2C19 (strongly) which metabolizes clonazepam, diazepam, phenytoin, etc.
 CYP2B6 (weakly) which metabolizes bupropion, cyclophosphamide, sertraline, tamoxifen, valproate, etc.

By so doing, fluvoxamine can increase serum concentration of the substrates of these enzymes.

Fluvoxamine may also elevate plasma levels of olanzapine by approximately two times. Combined olanzapine and fluvoxamine should be used cautiously and controlled clinically and by therapeutic drug monitoring to avoid olanzapine induced adverse effects and/or intoxication.

The plasma levels of oxidatively metabolized benzodiazepines (e.g., triazolam, midazolam, alprazolam and diazepam) are likely to be increased when co-administered with fluvoxamine. However the clearance of benzodiazepines metabolized by glucuronidation (e.g., lorazepam, oxazepam, temazepam) is unlikely to be affected by fluvoxamine. It appears that benzodiazepines metabolized by nitro-reduction (clonazepam, nitrazepam) are unlikely to be affected by fluvoxamine.

Using fluvoxamine and alprazolam together can increase alprazolam plasma concentrations. If alprazolam is coadministered with fluvoxamine, the initial alprazolam dose should be reduced to the lowest effective dose.

Fluvoxamine and ramelteon coadministration is not indicated.

Fluvoxamine has been observed to increase serum concentrations of mirtazapine, which is mainly metabolized by CYP1A2, CYP2D6, and CYP3A4, by three- to four-fold in humans. Caution and adjustment of dosage as necessary are warranted when combining fluvoxamine and mirtazapine.

Fluvoxamine seriously affects the pharmacokinetics of tizanidine and increases the intensity and duration of its effects. Because of the potentially hazardous consequences, the concomitant use of tizanidine with fluvoxamine, or other potent inhibitors of CYP1A2, should be avoided.

Pharmacology

Fluvoxamine is a potent selective serotonin reuptake inhibitor with around 100-fold affinity for the serotonin transporter over the norepinephrine transporter. It has negligible affinity for the dopamine transporter or any other site, with the sole exception of the σ1 receptor. It behaves as a potent agonist at this receptor and has the highest affinity (36 nM) of any SSRI for doing so. This may contribute to its antidepressant and anxiolytic effects and may also afford it some efficacy in treating the cognitive symptoms of depression. Unlike some other SSRI, fluvoxamine's metabolites are pharmacologically neutral.

History
Fluvoxamine was developed by Kali-Duphar, part of Solvay Pharmaceuticals, Belgium, now Abbott Laboratories, and introduced as Floxyfral in Switzerland in 1983. It was approved by the U.S. Food and Drug Administration (FDA) in 1994, and introduced as Luvox in the US. In India, it is available, among several other brands, as Uvox by Abbott. It was one of the first SSRI antidepressants to be launched, and is prescribed in many countries to patients with major depression. It was the first SSRI, a non-TCA drug, approved by the U.S. FDA specifically for the treatment of OCD. At the end of 1995, more than ten million patients worldwide had been treated with fluvoxamine. Fluvoxamine was the first SSRI to be registered for the treatment of obsessive compulsive disorder in children by the FDA in 1997. In Japan, fluvoxamine was the first SSRI to be approved for the treatment of depression in 1999 and was later in 2005 the first drug to be approved for the treatment of social anxiety disorder. Fluvoxamine was the first SSRI approved for clinical use in the United Kingdom.

Society and culture
Manufacturers include BayPharma, Synthon, and Teva, among others.

Research

COVID-19 

There is tentative evidence fluvoxamine might be useful for reducing COVID-19 disease severity if given as an early treatment. In Canada, Ontario's COVID-19 Advisory had approved it for usage if other preferred treatments were unavailable.

In May 2022, based on a review of available scientific evidence, the U.S. Food and Drug Administration (FDA) chose not to issue an emergency use authorization covering the use of fluvoxamine to treat COVID-19, saying that, at the time, the data was not sufficient to conclude that fluvoxamine may be effective in treating non-hospitalized people with COVID-19 to prevent serious illness or hospitalization. The agency stated that study results suggest that further clinical trials may be warranted.

Environment
Fluvoxamine is a common finding in waters near human settlement. Christensen et al. 2007 finds it is "very toxic to aquatic organisms" by European Union standards.

References

External links
 

AbbVie brands
Amines
Antidepressants
CYP1A2 inhibitors
CYP2D6 inhibitors
CYP3A4 inhibitors
Ethers
Ketoximes
Selective serotonin reuptake inhibitors
Sigma agonists
Trifluoromethyl compounds